Simona Frankel is the Israeli Ambassador to North Macedonia and was the Israeli Ambassador to Luxembourg and Belgium from 2015 until 2019.  She is one of several ambassadors who have been rebuked for comments they made about violence in the Gaza Strip.  She was summoned by the Ministry of Foreign Affairs (Israel) shortly after being “dressed down” by “Belgium’s Foreign Minister Didier Reynders ... after she claimed that all Palestinians killed in border clashes earlier in the week were ‘terrorists.’”

In 2019, Prime Minister Xavier Bettel of Luxemburg would not attend her farewell dinner. Bettel is gay and “that with all due respect to her work as ambassador, he can’t take part in a dinner for a representative from Israel, where one of its senior ministers made such comments about the LGBT community.“ (Education Minister Rafi Peretz had advocated gay conversion)  Amir Ohana, Israel’s gay justice minister, asked why Bettel did not take a similar stance with Iran.

References

Ambassadors of Israel to Belgium
Ambassadors of Israel to Luxembourg
Israeli women ambassadors
Year of birth missing (living people)
Living people
Ambassadors of Israel to North Macedonia